The 2003 FIA Sportscar Championship Oschersleben was the fourth race for the 2003 FIA Sportscar Championship season held at Motorsport Arena Oschersleben and ran for two hours and thirty minutes.  It took place on July 20, 2003.

Official results
Class winners in bold.  Cars failing to complete 75% of winner's distance marked as Not Classified (NC).

Statistics
 Pole Position - #5 RN Motorsport - 1:18.894
 Fastest Lap - #5 RN Motorsport - 1:21.377
 Distance - 381.368 km
 Average Speed - 152.045 km/h

References

O
FIA Sportscar